Susan Elizabeth Gathercole  was the Unit Director at the MRC Cognition and Brain Sciences Unit. from 2011 until 2018. She is a research psychologist, best known for her studies into working memory deficits in children. She has worked extensively with Professor Alan Baddeley, the co-creator, along with Professor Graham Hitch, of arguably the most well-researched working memory model. In 2014 she was elected a Fellow of the British Academy, the United Kingdom's national academy for the humanities and social sciences.

Gathercole's findings have demonstrated the link between working memory deficits in children and poor academic performance. Furthermore, she has contributed to recent research showing that working memory deficits can be overcome with computerised, adaptive working memory training.

Gathercole was appointed Officer of the Order of the British Empire (OBE) in the 2016 Birthday Honours for services to psychology and education.

References 

British psychologists
Living people
Year of birth missing (living people)
Place of birth missing (living people)
Officers of the Order of the British Empire